The Richest Man in Babylon is the third studio album by American electronic music duo Thievery Corporation. It was first released on September 30, 2002 in Belgium and on October 1, 2002 in the United States by ESL Music. The album features contributions from Emiliana Torrini, LouLou, Pam Bricker, and Notch, and features both electronic and live instrumentation. The album combines influences such as dub, jazz, dance music, rap, reggae, and Indian music, and incorporates protest music into the group's sound. A remix/dub version of the album was released in 2004 titled Babylon Rewound featuring the unreleased track "Truth And Rights".

Reception

The critical reception was mixed. BBC's Collective magazine said that "This, their third 'proper' album, is certainly their most complete work to date, and arguably the first to be presented as one complete, cohesive whole. [... T]his ranks as Thievery Corporation's finest yet." AllMusic's John Bush felt that the album "doesn't have the hooks or the production finesse to compete with The Mirror Conspiracy" but that "a few tracks on the backside do plow new ground, thanks in part to new guests". Among fans the album is popular, peaking at number 9 on Billboard'''s Independent Albums list on October 19, 2002 and number 2 on the Dance/Electronic Albums list on October 26, 2002. A month after the album was released, The Richest Man in Babylon'' had 25,000 sales in the United States.

Track listing

Charts

Release history

References

2002 albums
Thievery Corporation albums